Aphthona is a genus of beetle, in the leaf beetle family Chrysomelidae, native to Europe and Asia. More specifically, Aphthona are flea beetles, meaning they have enlarged hind legs for jumping away from potential danger. There are some 300 species known worldwide.

This flea beetle genus is important because of the usefulness of some species in controlling leafy spurge, a major invasive weed in parts of western North America. Several Aphthona species have been taken from Europe and introduced into localized areas of the United States and Canada, and some success against the weed is being seen. The six species used for this purpose include A. abdominalis, A. cyparissiae, A. czwalinae, A. flava, A. nigriscutis, and A. lacertosa, though A. abdominalis apparently never established a viable population and was never introduced in Canada.

Effectiveness of Control

Control is generally thought to be effective, but results vary from site to site, which has been attributed to soilborne pathogens, phenology of spring, soil texture, and leafy spurge density. Control is less effective in sandy soils. Control may not be reliably observed and measured for 10 years or more.

Selected species 

 Aphthona abdominalis
 Aphthona aeneomicans
 Aphthona albertinae
 Aphthona alcina
 Aphthona atrocaerulea
 Aphthona atrovirens
 Aphthona beauprei
 Aphthona beckeri
 Aphthona biokovensis
 Aphthona bonvouloiri
 Aphthona carbonaria
 Aphthona chinchihi
 Aphthona coerulea
 Aphthona constantini
 Aphthona crassipes
 Aphthona cyparissiae
 Aphthona czwalinae
 Aphthona delicatula
 Aphthona depressa
 Aphthona erichsoni
 Aphthona espagnoli
 Aphthona euphorbiae
 Aphthona flava
 Aphthona flaviceps
 Aphthona franzi
 Aphthona fuentei
 Aphthona gracilis
 Aphthona herbigrada
 Aphthona illigeri
 Aphthona juliana
 Aphthona konstantinovi
 Aphthona kuntzei
 Aphthona lacertosa
 Aphthona lubischevi
 Aphthona lutescens
 Aphthona maculata
 Aphthona maghrebina
 Aphthona maldesi
 Aphthona melancholica
 Aphthona microcephala
 Aphthona nigriceps
 Aphthona nigriscutis
 Aphthona nonstriata
 Aphthona occitana
 Aphthona ovata
 Aphthona pallida
 Aphthona parnassicola
 Aphthona perrisi
 Aphthona placida
 Aphthona plenifrons
 Aphthona poupillieri
 Aphthona punctiventris
 Aphthona pygmaea
 Aphthona reitteri
 Aphthona rhodiensis
 Aphthona rugipennis
 Aphthona sardea
 Aphthona sarmatica
 Aphthona semicyanea
 Aphthona seriata
 Aphthona sicelidis
 Aphthona signatifrons
 Aphthona stussineri
 Aphthona subovata
 Aphthona syriaca
 Aphthona testaceicornis
 Aphthona velachica
 Aphthona variolosa
 Aphthona vaulogeri
 Aphthona venustula
 Aphthona violacea
 Aphthona wagneri

References

External links

Alticini
Chrysomelidae genera
Taxa named by Louis Alexandre Auguste Chevrolat